Marisa Moseley (born March 12, 1982) is the head coach of the Wisconsin Badgers women's basketball team. She was announced on March 25, 2021, and will be the eighth head coach in the history of the Badgers. She was previously the head coach of the Boston University Terriers women's basketball team, where she compiled a 45–29 record.

Head coaching record

References 

1982 births
Living people
Sportspeople from Springfield, Massachusetts
Boston University Terriers women's basketball coaches
Boston University Terriers women's basketball players
Denver Pioneers women's basketball coaches
Minnesota Golden Gophers women's basketball coaches
UConn Huskies women's basketball coaches
Wisconsin Badgers women's basketball coaches